Chryss Goulandris, Lady O'Reilly (born 27 June 1950), also known as Chryssanthie (from the Greek) or Christina, is one of the richest women associated with Ireland, and holds both USA and Greek citizenship.  For many years, she owned a major horse breeding operation located in Ireland, France and other countries and was Chairperson of the Irish National Stud for over a decade. She is the wife of former media and industrial magnate Tony O'Reilly, and is heavily involved with The Ireland Funds.

Life
She was born in the United States to John Goulandris, a wealthy member of a Greek family of ship owners and operators, and Maria Lemos, from another Greek shipping dynasty. The family lived at the time in the Savoy Palace Hotel, with homes also in Greece, Connecticut, Switzerland and the Bahamas.

She grew up primarily in America (on Fifth Avenue, New York), with holidays spent in Greece, chiefly on the family's ancestral home island, Andros.

She studied French civilisation and art history at the Sorbonne in Paris, then returned to New York, working in the family offices, her business activities ranging from silver futures trading to horse breeding.

She met Tony O'Reilly briefly, with her brother, in Manhattan in 1989, at the Pierre Hotel, his usual base when staying in New York; he was in New York seeking funding for Waterford Wedgwood. They next met in 1990, after O'Reilly invited her to the Heinz 57 race in Dublin that year (she knew Ireland because of horse racing and breeding and was already considering buying a stud farm there), and a relationship developed, with the two becoming a couple in Lyford Cay the following Easter.

On September 14, 1991, they were married in the Bahamas, Goulandris's first marriage and O'Reilly's second. At the time, O'Reilly was said to be worth around $520 million and Goulandris $450 million, though some reports said the latter was worth more than the former.

In 1996, Tony O'Reilly bid $2.6 million for the  diamond engagement ring of Jacqueline Onassis, to give as a gift to Goulandris, who had known the Onassis family, and she, with some Heinz executives, made a naming gift in her husband's honor in 1999 with the O'Reilly Theater in Pittsburgh.

Homes
Goulandris shares a range of residences with her husband.  Although not tax resident in Ireland, one of her main homes is Castlemartin House and Estate near Kilcullen, County Kildare, which includes a horse stud facility and a Charolais cattle breeding operation.  She managed the restoration of the Georgian house's upper floor and roof.  Her official main residence is a house in the closed executive development of Lyford Cay near Nassau, the Bahamas; other are a  complex on the southern coast of Ireland at Shorecliffe, Glandore, County Cork, and a Georgian townhouse on Fitzwilliam Square, Dublin, and a chateau in Deauville, France.  She also owns property in New York.

Horse breeding
Goulandris owns, breeds, trains and races horses under a number of house names, including at least Castlemartin Stud (shared with her husband), Petra Bloodstock Agency, Skymarc Farm.  Castlemartin Stud is situated on the estate around one of her principal homes, with operations in multiple countries, and her horses are trained in Ireland, England, Normandy in France and in the USA at a stud called Matagorda, with many trainers employed across the various locations.

Two of her uncles were involved in racing, one, George, winning the English Oaks in 1962 and another, Constantin, owning the La Louviere Stud in France.  She bought her first racing horse, a yearling filly, in 1976, and in 1978, following her uncle Constantin's death, took over La Louviere Stud.

At the end of October 2006, she had around 100 horses in training, and 128 brood mares.  Her operations have a policy of selling male foals, and one of those sold was Helissio who won the 1996 Prix de l'Arc de Triomphe, while one retained was European champion miler in 1991.  In all, she has bred 11 Group 1 winners, including two wins at Royal Ascot.

National Stud
In 1993, Goulandris was appointed to the board of the Irish National Stud by the Minister for Agriculture, and in early June 1998, she was made its chairperson by Joe Walsh, in succession to David Shubotham, a post she continues to hold.

Wealth
Estimates of her personal wealth have varied greatly, but have exceeded 400 million USD since the early 1990s.  In June 2004, it was reported that she would be a major beneficiary of the sale of a family-owned unit of land in New York, assembled in the 1970s at a cost of about 25 million USD, for around 400 million USD and in 2005, her personal wealth was estimated at 442 million UK pounds.

Other activities
In June 1994, she was appointed a non-executive director of Waterford Wedgwood plc, with special responsibility for organizing commemorative events for the bicentenary of the death of Josiah Wedgwood.  She resigned from this role in January 2009. She was a director of the Wedgwood Museum Trust until June 2007 and is now an honorary member.

She has been Chairperson of the O'Reilly Foundation since its establishment, was invited by family friend Paul Newman to be first Chairperson of the Barrettstown Castle Hole in the Wall Club.

The Ireland Funds
Goulandris has been involved with The Ireland Funds for many years, especially with the annual Pittsburgh fundraising dinner.  She is the President d'Honneur of the Ireland Fund of France, and funded since 1993 the bourse Chryss O'Reilly de l'Ireland Fund de France, a 2000 euro per annum scholarship for eight universities in Northern Ireland and the Republic of Ireland.

Sources
 London, UK: The Racing Post, 15 July 2001, Michael Clower, "Lady O'Reilly Interview: Rebelline flies the flag for O'Reilly's worldwide empire" – "Lady O'Reilly, owner of Irish Oaks hope Rebelline, has 100 horses in training and 128 broodmares. Michael Clower went to see her at the Castlemartin stud and estate in County Kildare."

Notes and references

External links
 The O`Reilly Foundation
 Castlemartin Stud
 Forbes listing

Kilcullen
O'Reilly Foundation
Tony O'Reilly family
Waterford Wedgwood
1950 births
Racehorse owners and breeders
Greek businesspeople
American people of Greek descent
American billionaires
American businesspeople
American expatriates in France
American expatriates in the Bahamas
American emigrants to Ireland
Chryss
Living people
University of Paris alumni
Greek women in business